Philip Stuart Kitcher (born 20 February 1947) is a British philosopher who is John Dewey Professor Emeritus of philosophy at Columbia University.  He specialises in the philosophy of science, the philosophy of biology, the philosophy of mathematics, the philosophy of literature, and more recently pragmatism.

Life and career
Born in London, Kitcher spent his early life in Eastbourne, East Sussex, on the south coast of the United Kingdom, where another distinguished philosopher of an earlier generation (A. J. Ayer) was also at school. Kitcher himself went to school at Christ's Hospital, Horsham, West Sussex. He earned his B.A. in Mathematics/History and Philosophy of Science from Christ's College, Cambridge in 1969, and his PhD in History and Philosophy of Science from Princeton University in 1974, where he worked closely with Carl Hempel and Thomas Kuhn.

Kitcher is currently John Dewey Professor of Philosophy Emeritus at Columbia University. As chair of Columbia's Contemporary Civilization program (part of its undergraduate Core Curriculum), he also held the James R. Barker Professorship of Contemporary Civilization. Before moving to Columbia, Kitcher held tenure-track positions at the University of Vermont, The University of Minnesota, and University of California, San Diego where he held the position of Presidential Professor of Philosophy.

Kitcher is past president of the American Philosophical Association. In 2002, Kitcher was named a fellow of the American Academy of Arts and Sciences, and he was awarded the inaugural Prometheus Prize from the American Philosophical Association in 2006 in honour of extended achievement in the philosophy of science.
He was elected to the American Philosophical Society in 2018.
Kitcher was Editor-in-Chief of the journal Philosophy of Science from 1994 to 1999, was also a member of the NIH/DOE Working Group on the Ethical, Legal, and Social Implications of the Human Genome Project from  1995 to 1997.

He has trained a number of prominent philosophers of science, including Peter Godfrey-Smith (University of Sydney), Kyle Stanford (University of California, Irvine), and Michael R. Dietrich (University of Pittsburgh). He also taught C. Kenneth Waters (University of Calgary) and Michael Weisberg (University of Pennsylvania) as undergraduates.

He is married to Patricia Kitcher. She is a well known Kant scholar and philosopher of mind who has been the Mark Van Doren Professor of Humanities at Columbia. Their son, Charles Kitcher, is the Associate General Counsel for the Federal Election Commission.

Philosophical work
Within philosophy, Kitcher is best known for his work in philosophy of biology, science, and mathematics, and outside academia for his work examining creationism and sociobiology. His works attempt to connect the questions raised in philosophy of biology and philosophy of mathematics with the central philosophical issues of epistemology, metaphysics, and ethics.  He has also published papers on John Stuart Mill, Kant and other figures in the history of philosophy.  His 2012 book documented his developing interest in John Dewey and a pragmatic approach to philosophical issues. He sees pragmatism as providing a unifying and reconstructive approach to traditional philosophy issues. He had, a year earlier, published a book outlining a naturalistic approach to ethics, The Ethical Project (Harvard University Press, 2011). He has also done work on the philosophy of climate change.

Criteria for what constitutes "good science"

Kitcher's three criteria for good science are:

1.  Independent testability of auxiliary hypotheses
 "An auxiliary hypothesis ought to be testable independently of the particular problem it is introduced to solve, independently of the theory it is designed to save" (e.g. the evidence for the existence of Neptune is independent of the anomalies in Uranus's orbit).
2.  Unification
 "A science should be unified .... Good theories consist of just one problem-solving strategy, or a small family of problem-solving strategies, that can be applied to a wide range of problems".
3.  Fecundity
 "A great scientific theory, like Newton's, opens up new areas of research... Because a theory presents a new way of looking at the world, it can lead us to ask new questions, and so to embark on new and fruitful lines of inquiry... Typically, a flourishing science is incomplete. At any time, it raises more questions than it can currently answer. But incompleteness is no vice. On the contrary, incompleteness is the mother of fecundity... A good theory should be productive; it should raise new questions and presume that those questions can be answered without giving up its problem-solving strategies".

He increasingly recognised the role of values in practical decisions about scientific research.

Kuhn and creationism

Kitcher is the author of Abusing Science: The Case Against Creationism. He has commented on the way creationists have misinterpreted Kuhn:

Thomas Kuhn's book The Structure of Scientific Revolutions has probably been more widely read—and more widely misinterpreted—than any other book in the recent philosophy of science.  The broad circulation of his views has generated a popular caricature of Kuhn's position.  According to this popular caricature, scientists working in a field belong to a club.  All club members are required to agree on main points of doctrine.  Indeed, the price of admission is several years of graduate education, during which the chief dogmas are inculcated.  The views of outsiders are ignored.  Now I want to emphasize that this is a hopeless caricature, both of the practice of scientists and of Kuhn's analysis of the practice.  Nevertheless, the caricature has become commonly accepted as a faithful representation, thereby lending support to the Creationists' claims that their views are arrogantly disregarded.

Books
Abusing Science: The Case Against Creationism. MIT Press, 1982 (paperback 1983). 
The Nature of Mathematical Knowledge. Oxford University Press, 1983 (paperback 1984).
Vaulting Ambition: Sociobiology and the Quest for Human Nature.  MIT Press, 1985 (paperback 1987).
The Advancement of Science, Oxford University Press, April 1993 (paper January 1995).
The Lives to Come: The Genetic Revolution and Human Possibilities (Simon and Schuster [US], Penguin [UK], January 1996, paperback editions 1997). The American paperback contains a postscript on cloning, almost identical with his article "Whose Self is it, Anyway?”.
Patterns of Scientific Controversies, essay in Scientific Controversies: Philosophical and Historical Perspectives, Oxford University Press, 2000. 
Science, Truth, and Democracy, Oxford University Press, 2001; paperback 2003. 
In Mendel's Mirror: Philosophical Reflections on Biology, Oxford University Press, 2003. (This is a collection of seventeen of his articles).
Finding an Ending: Reflections on Wagner’s Ring, co-authored with Richard Schacht, Oxford University Press, February 2004. 
Living with Darwin: Evolution, Design, and the Future of Faith, Oxford University Press, January 2007. 
Joyce's Kaleidoscope: An Invitation to Finnegans Wake, Oxford University Press, July 2007. 
The Ethical Project, Harvard University Press, October 2011. 
Science in a Democratic Society, Prometheus Books, September 2011. 
Preludes to Pragmatism: Toward a Reconstruction of Philosophy, Oxford University Press, 2012. 
Deaths in Venice: The Cases of Gustav von Aschenbach, Columbia University Press, November 2013. 
Life After Faith: The Case for Secular Humanism, Yale University Press, 2014. 
Moral Progress, Oxford University Press, 2021.

References

External links

The Quest For Inclusion in the Science and Religion Debate
Philip Kitcher website via Columbia University.
Interview by Point of Inquiry 13 July 2007 (mp3/podcast).  Kitcher "explores the implications of Darwinism for both literalist religion, and for liberal faith" and "discusses the role and benefits of religion, and explores alternatives to it, such as secular humanism, and offers ideas for how secular humanism might become more popular in society."
Fighting incompleteness, interview by David Auerbach, 3am Magazine, 31 January 2014.
Life after faith: Interview with Richard Marshall 3am Magazine, 2 August 2015.

1947 births
20th-century English male writers
20th-century British non-fiction writers
20th-century British philosophers
20th-century essayists
21st-century English male writers
21st-century British non-fiction writers
21st-century British philosophers
21st-century essayists
Alumni of Christ's College, Cambridge
Analytic philosophers
British ethicists
British humanists
British male essayists
Charles Darwin biographers
Columbia University faculty
Critics of creationism
Empiricists
Epistemologists
Living people
Members of the American Philosophical Society
Metaphysicians
Ontologists
People educated at Christ's Hospital
Philosophers of culture
Philosophers of education
Philosophers of literature
Philosophers of mathematics
Philosophers of mind
Philosophers of psychology
Philosophers of science
Philosophers of technology
Philosophy academics
Philosophers of biology
Philosophy writers
Pragmatists
Princeton University alumni
Secular humanists
Social philosophers
University of California, San Diego faculty
University of Michigan faculty
University of Minnesota faculty
University of Vermont faculty
Vassar College faculty
Writers about religion and science
Lakatos Award winners